The 2016–17 San Diego Toreros women's basketball team will represent the University of San Diego in the 2016–17 college basketball season. The Toreros, members of the West Coast Conference, were led by head coach Cindy Fisher, in her twelfth season at the school. The Toreros play their home games at the Jenny Craig Pavilion on the university campus in San Diego, California. They finished the season 14–16, 7–11 in WCC play to finish in seventh place. They advanced to the quarterfinals of the WCC women's tournament where they lost to BYU.

Roster

Schedule

|-
!colspan=9 style="background:#002654; color:#97CAFF;"| Exhibition

|-
!colspan=9 style="background:#002654; color:#97CAFF;"| Non-conference regular season

|-
!colspan=9 style="background:#002654; color:#97CAFF;"| WCC regular season

|-
!colspan=9 style="background:#002654; color:#97CAFF;"| WCC Women's Tournament

Rankings
2016–17 NCAA Division I women's basketball rankings

References

San Diego
San Diego Toreros women's basketball seasons
San Diego Toreros
San Diego Toreros